Amara Kamara (born February 2, 1988) is a Liberian former gridiron football linebacker. After his family immigrated to the United States, he attended local schools in Newark, New Jersey, where he started playing American football. In 2006, he was named by The Star-Ledger as the State Defensive Player of the Year.

Early life and education
Amara Kamara was born in Liberia in 1988. He immigrated to the United States with his family, and they settled in Newark, New Jersey. He attended local schools and was known from his early years for his athletic ability.

While attending Newark Tech High School, Kamara competed athletically playing football at Weequahic High School also in Newark. He was named as second-team All-American, and in 2006 he made 193 total tackles and seven forced fumbles. That year, he was named by The Star-Ledger as the State Defensive Player of the Year. He graduated from Newark Tech High School in 2007.

College career
Kamara attended Temple University in Philadelphia, Pennsylvania. In his first year as an Owl on their football team, he was the only freshman to start every game. He recorded 71 total tackles in his first year. Going into his sophomore season as an Owl, Kamara was named the starter at the Linebacker position. He graduated in 2011.

Professional career
Kamara entered the 2011 NFL Draft but was not drafted.

BC Lions
On September 27, 2011, Kamara was signed by the BC Lions of British Columbia, Canada. They are based in Vancouver, British Columbia.

Harrisburg Stampede
On December 20, 2013, Kamara signed with the Harrisburg Stampede of the Professional Indoor Football League, based in Hershey, Pennsylvania.

Lehigh Valley Steelhawks
On February 18, 2015, Kamara signed with the Lehigh Valley Steelhawks, also of the PIFL. He earned Second-team All-PIFL as a defensive lineman following the season. On May 12, 2016, Kamara signed with the Steelhawks during the 2016 season.

References

1988 births
Living people
Players of American football from Newark, New Jersey
Players of Canadian football from Newark, New Jersey
Temple Owls football players
Liberian players of American football
BC Lions players
Harrisburg Stampede players
Lehigh Valley Steelhawks players
San Diego Chargers players
Kansas City Chiefs players
Liberian emigrants to the United States
Weequahic High School alumni